The TRX System, also known as Total Resistance Exercises, refers to a specialized form of suspension training that utilizes equipment developed by former U.S. Navy SEAL Randy Hetrick. TRX is a form of suspension training that uses body weight exercises to develop strength, balance, flexibility and core stability simultaneously. It requires the use of the TRX Suspension Trainer, a performance training tool that leverages gravity and the user’s body weight to complete the exercises. TRX's designers claim that it draws on research from the military, pro sports, and academic institutions along with experience gathered from the TRX team, who work "with thousands of athletes, coaches, trainers, first responders, subject matter experts, professors, and service members in all branches."

History 
While deployed in Southeast Asia in 1997, Hetrick was looking for a different method of training than the generic push-ups. He used familiar products–a jiu-jitsu belt and parachute webbing–to create the first version of the TRE Suspension Trainer. In 2001, after 14 years as a SEAL Hetrick left the Navy and attended Stanford University where he earned his MBA.  He attended the gym regularly with the hopes of bringing his apparatus to a working prototype by gaining the attention of athletes, coaches and trainers. Hetrick first established his TRX system at the Krav Maga Fitness Club in San Francisco with US$350,000 from private investors who he met through connections via Stanford and the military. He began to sell the line of training equipment known today as TRX.

Benefits and criticism
Supporters of TRX Training claim that it can improve mobility and stability, increase metabolic results, build lean muscle, and develop functional strength. Other advocates of the system say that you can't help but use your core for stabilization. Hedrick states that, "People who like yoga and Pilates tend to like TRX because there are some crossovers. But it's also great for runners, cyclists, or anyone who is an endurance athlete and wants to have more strength training." However, some analysts worry that the instability of suspension straps could possibly result in injury, especially for those with a history of joint or back injuries, or inadequate core strength. Fabio Comana, a research scientist at the nonprofit American Council on Exercise, states that suspension training may work for well-conditioned athletes and gym-goers who regularly train their core, however, it is potentially dangerous for those who haven’t built up their core.

References

External links
 How I Built This - TRX: Randy Hetrick
9 TRX Moves to sculpt an Insanely strong upper body

Weight training equipment
Exercise equipment companies
Exercise equipment
Exercise-related trademarks
Companies that filed for Chapter 11 bankruptcy in 2022